"Pasadena" is the debut single by Australian pop singer John Young, released in January 1972 and peaking at number 16 on the Australian Go-Set Chart.

The single was released under the name John Young. Young's subsequent releases used "John Paul Young" to avoid confusion with Johnny Young (no relation), the 1960s pop star and Young Talent Time (1971–1988 TV show) presenter. Young performed the song on Happening 70 on Channel Ten.

"Pasadena" was re-recorded in 1975 for Young's debut studio album, Hero.

Track listing 
7" (AP-9765)
Side A "Pasadena" (David Hemmings, Harry Vanda & George Young) - 3:15
Side B "Better Go Back to Bed" (Simon Napier-Bell, H. Vanda & G. Young) - 2:20

Charts

Weekly charts

Year-end charts

Personnel 
 John Paul Young — lead vocals
 George Young - backing vocals
 Ian "Willie" Winter — guitar
 Johnny Dick — drums, percussion
 Warren Morgan — (keyboards, backing vocals)
 Ronnie Peel — bass, backing vocals)
 Ray Goodwin — guitar

References

External links
 John Paul Young - Pasadena (7" single)

1972 songs
1972 debut singles
John Paul Young songs
Songs written by Harry Vanda
Songs written by George Young (rock musician)
Albert Productions singles